The Thief, His Wife and the Canoe is an ITV television drama series that was first broadcast on 17 April 2022. Written by Chris Lang and directed by Richard Laxton, the programme dramatizes the John Darwin disappearance case, where prison officer and teacher John Darwin faked his own death and reappeared, five and a half years after he was believed to have died in a canoeing accident.

Cast
Eddie Marsan as John Darwin
Monica Dolan as Anne Darwin
Mark Stanley as Mark Darwin
Dominic Applewhite as Anthony Darwin
Karl Pilkington as DC Phil Bayley

Production
Hartlepool, Walthamstow, Seaton Carew and Middlesbrough were used as filming locations.

Episodes

Reception
Stuart Jeffries for The Guardian gave the series four out of five stars.

References

External links
 

2022 British television series debuts
2022 British television series endings
2020s British drama television series
2020s British crime television series
2020s British television miniseries
British crime drama television series
ITV television dramas
English-language television shows